Alternative Cabaret was a collective of politically motivated performers and musicians. It was set up by Tony Allen and Alexei Sayle in the summer of 1979 shortly after they had met at the newly opened London Comedy Store. They quickly recruited comedians Jim Barclay, Andy de la Tour and Pauline Melville; plus folk duos Chisholm and Stevens and Gasmask and Hopkins, and jazz salsa band Combo Passe.

Echoing what was already happening in a few fringe theatres, most notably the Albany Deptford and the Half Moon Mile End, members were encouraged to open regular club nights under the name Alternative Cabaret in pub function rooms, student union bars and community venues around London. The flagship Alt Cab night was run by Allen and Sayle in the back bar of the Elgin in Ladbroke Grove, between August 1979 and May 1980. While always an adamant non-member Keith Allen was a regular guest at many Alt Cab club nights. Among other regular guests were Maggie Steed and Arnold Brown.

The non-racist, non-sexist, and often radical slant to the material of Alternative Cabaret’s comedians soon became the main attraction and the focus of press interest; as a consequence the phrase Alternative Comedy became parlance and was employed to describe an emerging approach to comedy entertainment across the London fringe including The Comedy Store where audiences and performers were still often being polarised into opposing Alternative and Traditional camps.

Shortly before he parted company with Alternative Cabaret, Alexei Sayle joined Tony Allen to play the Edinburgh festival in Aug 1980 with Late Night Alternative at the Heriot-Watt Theatre. From October 1980 he fronted the first season of alternative cabaret titled The Comic Strip at the Boulevard Theatre within the Raymond Revuebar, bringing in selected stand-up acts from the Comedy Store, a lineup who were soon to become television stars with The Comic Strip Presents.

Meanwhile in 1981 Allen returned to the Edinburgh festival with Andy De La Tour, Jim Barclay and Pauline Melville and Alternative Cabaret at the Assembly Rooms was a noted hit. Highlights of the ensuing national tour were released as an album ‘Alternative Cabaret’ on original records later that year. Having served its purpose, Alternative Cabaret then quietly disbanded and merged into what was becoming the thriving London Alternative Comedy circuit.

See also
 The Comic Strip
 Saturday Live (UK TV series)
 The Comedy Store (London)
 Batcave (club)
 Gargoyle Club

References 

Comedy genres
Comedy collectives
1979 establishments in England
1981 disestablishments in England